HGF may refer to:

 Harold Grinspoon Foundation, an American Jewish youth organization
 Helmholtz Association of German Research Centres, the largest scientific organisation in Germany
 Hepatocyte growth factor, a paracrine cellular growth, motility and morphogenic factor
 Hereditary gingival fibromatosis, a rare condition of gingival overgrowth
 Human Growth Foundation, an American patients' organization
 Mercury(IV) fluoride (HgF), HgF4, is the first mercury compound to be discovered with mercury in the oxidation state IV